Peter Joseph McLaughlin (May 16, 1884 - December 8, 1959) was a professional baseball umpire who worked in the National League from 1924 to 1927. McLaughlin umpired 447 major league games in his four-year career. He also umpired in the Eastern League. In 1933, he umpired in the Cape Cod Baseball League.

References

External links
Retrosheet

1884 births
1959 deaths
Major League Baseball umpires
British referees and umpires
Cape Cod Baseball League